Malene Brock is a Danish former cricketer. She played eight Women's One Day International matches for Denmark women's national cricket team between 1997 and 1998.

References

External links
 

Year of birth missing (living people)
Living people
Danish women cricketers
Denmark women One Day International cricketers
Place of birth missing (living people)